Un mandarino per Teo is a 1960 Italian comedy film directed by Mario Mattoli and starring Walter Chiari.

Cast
 Walter Chiari - Teo Tosci
 Sandra Mondaini - Rosanella Ferrante
 Ave Ninchi - Zia Gaspara
 Riccardo Billi - Ignazio Fumoni
 Carlo Delle Piane - Lo stagnaro
 Annie Gorassini - Angelo biondo
 Chim Kem - Il cinese
 Dante Bisio - Regista Fracassoni
 Anne Marie Delos - Nina Chevrolet
 Corrado Olmi - Il signore in bianco
 Salvo Libassi - Aiuto regista
 Enrico Salvatore - Aiuto regista (as Salvatore Enrico)
 Alberto Bonucci - Il notaio

External links

Un mandarino per Teo at Variety Distribution

1960 films
1960 comedy films
Italian comedy films
1960s Italian-language films
Films directed by Mario Mattoli
1960s Italian films